Jacqueline Frances Kent (born 1947) is an Australian journalist, biographer and non-fiction writer. She is also known as Jacquie Kent, the name she used when writing young adult fiction in the 1990s and  sometimes writes as Frances Cook.

Career
Kent was born in Sydney in 1947 and later moved to Adelaide, returning to Sydney to a position with the Australian Broadcasting Commission following graduation with an Arts degree.

Kent wrote her first book, Out of the Bakelite Box: The Heyday of Australian Radio, while working as a freelance editor. Published in 1983 by Angus & Robertson, it was described by Maurice Dunlevy in The Canberra Times: "This popular social history of Australian radio after World War II is a classic piece of book journalism" and "a buzz from beginning to end". In 1985 she curated an exhibition called "On Air" for the National Film and Sound Archive.

She was appointed to the judging panel for the National Short Story of the Year competition for 1984 and 1985.

In 1985 she met Kenneth Cook, subject of her 2019 memoir, Beyond Words, and author of Wake in Fright. They married and were together until his sudden death in April 1987.

Kent is a frequent contributor to and book reviewer for Australian publications, including Australian Book Review, Meanjin, The Weekend Australian, The Sydney Morning Herald and The Age. She has contributed five biographies to the Australian Dictionary of Biography.

In 2007 Kent was awarded a Doctorate of Creative Arts from the University of Technology Sydney for her thesis, "Artistry Under Oath: Biography and the life story of Hephzibah Menuhin". The following year it was published by Viking as An Exacting Heart.

Awards and recognition

Book awards

A Certain Style
National Biography Award, winner, 2002
 Nita Kibble Literary Award, winner, 2002
 New South Wales Premier's Literary Awards Douglas Stewart Prize for Non-Fiction, shortlisted, 2002
An Exacting Heart 
The Age Book of the Year Award, Non-Fiction Prize, shortlisted, 2008
 Queensland Premier's Literary Awards, Best Non-Fiction Book and Best History Book, shortlisted, 2008
 Nita Kibble Literary Award, winner, 2009
 New South Wales Premier's Literary Awards, Douglas Stewart Prize for Non-Fiction and Community Relations Commission Award, shortlisted, 2009
 Festival Awards for Literature (SA), Award for Non-Fiction, shortlisted, 2010
 The Australian Historical Association Awards, Magarey Medal for Biography, shortlisted, 2010
Beyond Words: A Year with Kenneth Cook
 National Biography Award, shortlisted, 2020

Fellowships

 Beatrice Davis Editorial Fellowship, 1994
 Hazel Rowley Literary Fellowship
 shortlisted, for a biography of Robert Helpmann, 2016
 winner, for a biography of Vida Goldstein, 2018

Works

Biography and memoir

A Certain Style: Beatrice Davis, a Literary Life, Viking, 2001
An Exacting Heart: The Story of Hephzibah Menuhin, Viking, 2008
The Making of Julia Gillard, Viking, 2009
Take Your Best Shot: The Prime Ministership of Julia Gillard, Penguin, 2013
Beyond Words: A Year with Kenneth Cook, University of Queensland Press, 2019
Vida: A Woman For Our Time, Penguin, 2020

Non-fiction

Out of the Bakelite Box: The Heyday of Australian Radio, Angus & Robertson, 1983
In the Half Light: Life as a Child in Australia 1900-1970, Angus & Robertson, 1988

Young adult fiction

Angel Claws, I Love You, Puffin, 1992
Heartbreak High, 1998
Making Up, Breaking Up, ABC Books, 1998
Love, Hate, ABC Books, 1998
Secrets and Lies, ABC Books, 1999
Tough Call, ABC Books, 1999

References

1947 births
Living people
Australian biographers
Women biographers
20th-century Australian women writers